Stephanosaurus (meaning "crown lizard") is a dubious genus of hadrosaurid dinosaur with a complicated taxonomic history.

In 1902, Lawrence Lambe named a new set of hadrosaurid limb material and other bones (originally GSC 419) from Alberta  as Trachodon marginatus. Paleontologists began finding better remains of hadrosaurids from the same rocks in the 1910s, in what is now known as the late Campanian-age (Upper Cretaceous) Dinosaur Park Formation.

Lambe assigned two new skulls to T. marginatus, and based on the new information, coined the genus Stephanosaurus for the species in 1914. Lambe retained the original species marginatus, so the type specimen of Stephanosaurus was the original, scrappy limb bones and crushed skull fragments, not the two new skulls.

However, the limb bones and skull fragments could not be reliably said to come from the same animal as the complete skulls, or differentiated from other hadrosaurs. Because there was very little to associate the complete skulls with the scrappy earlier marginatus material, in 1923 William Parks proposed a new genus and species for the skulls, with both generic and specific names honoring Lambe: Lambeosaurus lambei (type specimen NMC 2869, originally GSC 2869). Stephanosaurinae, a group which Lambe named in 1920, was also renamed Lambeosaurinae.

See also
 Timeline of hadrosaur research

References

Late Cretaceous dinosaurs of North America
Hadrosaurs
Nomina dubia
Paleontology in Alberta
Campanian genus first appearances
Campanian genus extinctions
Ornithischian genera

it:Stephanosaurus